Gladys Sommereux (née Reyes; born June 23, 1977), is a Filipino actress best known for her role as "Clara," the lead villainess from the 90s ABS-CBN hit series Mara Clara. In 2012, after years with her home network ABS-CBN, she transferred back to GMA Network. She received the PMPC Star Awards for Best Drama Actress for the TV series Saan Ka Man Naroroon.

She received a Urian Award for Best Supporting Actress for her role in the film Magkakabaung.

She is currently a member of the Movie and Television Review and Classification Board (MTRCB).

Biography

Background
Known by the alias Primera Kontrabida, Gladys Reyes had her big break with the 1990s soap opera Mara Clara, as Clara, which was later portrayed by Julia Montes in the hit remake of the same name.

She is the wife of Christopher Roxas (born Jean-Christopher Sommereux, 1978), her co-star in the said soap opera. They have four 
children.

Reyes is a member of Iglesia ni Cristo, and an alumna of New Era University, where she earned her bachelor's degree in Mass Communications.

Career

Filmography

Film

Television

Awards and nominations

References

External links
 

1977 births
Filipino child actresses
Living people
People from Davao City
Actresses from Davao del Sur
Members of Iglesia ni Cristo
That's Entertainment Tuesday Group Members
Star Circle Quest
Filipino women comedians
ABS-CBN personalities
That's Entertainment (Philippine TV series)
Intercontinental Broadcasting Corporation personalities
TV5 (Philippine TV network) personalities
GMA Network personalities
20th-century Filipino actresses
21st-century Filipino actresses
New Era University alumni